Quartzville Creek is a  tributary of the Middle Santiam River in Linn County in the U.S. state of Oregon. It is paralleled by the Quartzville Back Country Byway and used for recreation, including camping, fishing, hunting, kayaking, and gold panning. The lower  of the creek, from the Willamette National Forest boundary to Green Peter Reservoir, was designated Wild and Scenic in 1988.

Course
In its upper reaches, it receives Butte and Bruler creeks from the right, Freezeout Creek from the left, Beabe Creek from the left, Little Meadows Creek from the right, Gregg and McQuade creeks from the left, then Gold Creek from the right. In the next stretch, Green, Savage, and Galena creeks enter from the left. Below Galena Creek, Quartzville Creek leaves the national forest and Canal Creek enters from the right. One of Canal Creek's tributaries, Dry Gulch, drains the former Quartzville townsite for which Quartzville Creek is named.

Downstream of Canal Creek, the creek is followed on the right by Quartzville Road. Along this stretch, Yellowbottom Creek enters from the right at Yellowbottom Campground. Shortly thereafter, the creek turns sharply south and receives Packers Gulch from the right. Further downstream, Boulder Creek enters from the left, then Yellowstone and Four Bit creeks, both from the right. Thereafter, Quartzville Creek reaches the Dogwood Picnic Area, on the right, and Cascade Falls, on a minor tributary to the left. The creek then flows by a stream gauge maintained by the United States Geological Survey  from the mouth. Here Panther Creek enters from the right.

Continuing generally southwest, the creek receives Trout Creek and Moose Creek from the right as it enters a northern arm of Green Peter Reservoir. Foots Canyon, which drains part of Green Peter Peninsula, enters from the left before the creek reaches Whitcomb Creek Park, on the right. About  beyond the park, the creek merges with the Middle Santiam River,  from its confluence with the South Santiam River at Foster Reservoir.

Discharge

This flow occurred during the floods of December 1964 and January 1965, rated by the National Weather Service as one of Oregon's top 10 weather events of the 20th century.

See also 
 List of rivers of Oregon

References

External links
Quartzville Road Back Country Byway
South Santiam Watershed Council
National Wild and Scenic Rivers System

Rivers of Linn County, Oregon
Rivers of Oregon
Wild and Scenic Rivers of the United States